Timothy Alan Kinnan (born April 24, 1948) is a former lieutenant general in the United States Air Force; he retired from active duty in September 2004.

Personal and family background
Kinnan was born in Tacoma, Washington to the late Henry Wallace ("Wally") Kinnan, and Marjorie Ahrendt.  His father, Wally Kinnan, a pioneering television meteorologist and early television personality, was also a B-17 pilot during World War II and was shot down, spending nearly two years as a POW in Stalag Luft III.  While interned Wally was a founding member of the Sagan Serenaders, a group of musicians who were immortalized in the movie The Great Escape for holding concerts to cover the sound of digging associated with the escape attempt.  Wally's war-time and peacetime service created in Tim a strong interest in the US Air Force.  Getting both the interest in flying and an interest in music from his father he had to make a choice between the US Air Force Academy and music school.  The Air Force won out and he entered the US Air Force Academy in 1966 receiving his commission in 1970.  Following graduation he married Sue Elaine Kelley.  He has two daughters, Jennifer and Emily and five grandchildren, Kelley, Jillian, Lydia, Max, and Gabrielle.

Education
Kinnan's military education includes the United States Air Force Academy (USAFA) in Colorado Springs, Colorado (Class of  1970); Distinguished Graduate Air Force Squadron Officers School in 1974, Air Command and Staff College in 1976, Armed Forces Staff College in 1981, Distinguished Graduate National War College in 1990, Joint Force Air Component Commander Course in 1995 and Joint Flag Officer Warfighting Course in 1997.

In his civilian studies, he earned a Master of Science degree in astronautical and aeronautical engineering from Purdue University.

Service career
Kinnan was commissioned a second lieutenant upon graduation from the U.S. Air Force Academy with the Class of 1970.

He was a command pilot with more than 3,000 flying hours, primarily in the F-4, F-15 and F-16.

In 1977, he was awarded the first Risner Trophy as the outstanding graduate of the USAF Weapons School.

In 1993, as commander of the 401st Fighter Wing in Aviano, Italy, he led the beddown and support of joint and combined airpower in NATO's Deny Flight Operation over Bosnia and Herzegovina. Later, as commander of the 347th Wing, he was responsible for the first operational deployment to Southwest Asia under the Air Force's aerospace expeditionary force concept. Other commands include an F-15 squadron, the Air War College and Air Force Doctrine Center.

General Kinnan served as vice director for strategic plans and policy with the Joint Staff in Washington, D.C., supporting the Chairman of the Joint Chiefs of Staff in developing military strategy and policy within the interagency process in Washington.

His final active duty assignment was U.S. military representative to the North Atlantic Treaty Organization Military Committee, NATO Headquarters, Brussels, Belgium. He represented the Chairman of the Joint Chiefs of Staff in deliberations and actions of the military committee, NATO's highest military authority. He also worked with military representatives of NATO and Partnership for Peace member nations to develop policy recommendations for the political authorities of the alliance.

Civilian career
Until February 2007 he was vice president, C4ISR at Lockheed Martin Corporation.

Flight information
Rating: Command Pilot
Flight hours: More than 3000
Aircraft flown: F-4, F-15 and F-16

Major awards and decorations
  Defense Distinguished Service Medal (with 2 Oak Leaf Clusters)
  Air Force Distinguished Service Medal
  Defense Superior Service Medal
  Legion of Merit (with Oak Leaf Cluster)
  Meritorious Service Medal (with 4 Oak Leaf Clusters)
  Air Medal
  Air Force Commendation Medal
  Commemorative Medal for Advancing Latvia's Membership to NATO
Joint Chiefs of Staff Identification Badge
Robinson Risner Trophy, 1977 
Purdue University Outstanding Aerospace Engineer Award, 2008

Effective Dates Of Promotion

  Second Lieutenant — June 3, 1970
  First Lieutenant — December 3, 1971
  Captain — December 3, 1973
  Major — September 1, 1979
  Lieutenant Colonel — December 1, 1982
  Colonel — April 1, 1988
  Brigadier General — August 15, 1994
  Major General — August 15, 1996
  Lieutenant General — September 1, 2001

Official military biography pages

Kinnan biography at NATO International weblink

External links
Kinnan on Active AFASW Members List
Timothy Kinnan profile at spock.com
Conestoga High School (GA) bio
NATO official Kinnan assessed highly Bulgaria's progress

1948 births
Living people
United States Air Force Academy alumni
United States Air Force generals
Recipients of the Legion of Merit
Recipients of the Air Medal
Recipients of the Defense Superior Service Medal
Recipients of the Defense Distinguished Service Medal
Recipients of the Air Force Distinguished Service Medal
Purdue University School of Aeronautics and Astronautics alumni